16 Tales is a series of educational video games developed by The Lightspan Partnership starting in 1996. Each game consists of four 15-minute video programs detailing various cultures' stories and lore.

References

1996 video games
PlayStation (console) games
Video games developed in the United States